Business Day is a national daily newspaper in South Africa, published weekdays (Monday to Friday) and also available as an e-paper. Based in Parktown, Johannesburg, it is edited by Alexander Parker and published by Arena Holdings, which is also the parent company of the Financial Mail magazine and Business Day TV (formerly known as Summit TV).

The newspaper, launched on 1 May 1985, covers all major national and international news, with a specific focus on the South African economy and business sector, companies and financial markets. It also contains an influential opinion section with several popular columnists, along with coverage of sport, travel, books, arts and entertainment.

Business Day has its digital identity on BusinessLIVE. It also has apps for the iPhone and iPad, Android devices and Huawei devices.

Supplements
Motor News (Thursdays) 
Home Front (Once a month)
 Investors Monthly (Once a month)
Sport (Once a month)
Wanted (Once a month)

Distribution areas

Distribution figures

Readership figures

See also
 List of newspapers in South Africa

References

External links
 Business Day Website
 Mobile Site
 SAARF Website

Business newspapers
Mass media in Johannesburg
Daily newspapers published in South Africa
Newspapers established in 1985
1985 establishments in South Africa
Business in South Africa